Anna Jackson (born 1967) is a New Zealand poet, fiction and non-fiction writer and an academic.

Biography 
Jackson grew up in Auckland and now lives in Wellington. She has an MA from the University of Auckland and a DPhil from Oxford University. She is currently an associate professor in the School of English, Film, Theatre and Media Studies at Victoria University of Wellington.

Her poems were first published in the collection AUP New Poets 1 (AUP, 1999) and she has since published a number of collections of poetry, as well as writing and co-editing works of literary criticism, essays, short stories and book reviews for publications in New Zealand and overseas. Much of her poetry explores the ideas of family and childhood. Her writing has appeared in journals and anthologies, and she has published several collections of poetry. The Gas Leak was reviewed in the Journal of New Zealand Literature.

Pasture and Flock: New and Selected Poems, published by Auckland University Press, was reviewed on Radio New Zealand's Nine to Noon programme on 3 April 2018.

Thicket by Anna Jackson was reviewed in the Listener magazine, and in takahē magazine. I, Clodia, and Other Portraits was reviewed by Cordite Poetry Review, and Landfall.

Awards and honours
She has received a number of awards for her work, including a 1999 Louis Johnson New writers’ Bursary, the 2001 Waikato University Writer in Residence, the Katherine Mansfield Menton Fellowship in 2015, and in 2016 she was selected for the Residency Programme at the Michael King Writers’ Centre in 2017. In 2018 she was a winner of Viva la Novella VI with The Bed-making Competition.

Publications 
Her work includes the following:

Poetry 
 Pasture and Flock: New and Selected Poems (Auckland UP, 2018)
 I, Clodia (Auckland UP, 2014)
 Thicket (Auckland UP, 2011)
 The Gas Leak (Auckland UP, 2006)
 Catullus for Children (Auckland UP, 2003)
 The Pastoral Kitchen (Auckland UP, 2001)
 The Long Road to Teatime (Auckland UP, 2000)

Editor
 Truth and Beauty: Verse Biography in Canada, Australia and New Zealand (co-edited with Angelina Sbroma & Helen Rickerby: Victoria UP, 2016)
 Verse Biography (special issue of the journal Biography: Hawai’i UP, 2016)
 Floating Worlds: Essays on Contemporary New Zealand Fiction (co-edited with Jane Stafford: Victoria UP, 2009)
 The Gothic in Children’s Literature: Haunting the Borders (co-edited with Karen Coats & Rod McGillis: Routledge, 2007)

Fiction 

 The Bed-making Competition (2018)

References

External links 
 https://www.anzliterature.com/member/anna-jackson/
 http://www.annajackson.nz
 http://www.press.auckland.ac.nz/en/browse-books/authors-a-z/anna-jackson.html
 
 

1967 births
Living people
People from Wellington City
New Zealand poets
People from Auckland
New Zealand women poets